Starlight is the visible radiation emitted by stars other than the Sun.

Starlight or Star light may also refer to:

Books and comics
 Starlight (comics), a six-issue limited series from Image Comics
 Starlight (Marvel Comics), Dr. Tania Belinsky, a Marvel Comics character
 "Starlight" (fairy tale), by Marie-Madeleine de Lubert
 Starlight (novel), 2006 novel in Warriors: The New Prophecy series by Erin Hunter
 "Star Light" (short story), by Isaac Asimov
 Starlight (anthology series), science fiction and fantasy
 Star Light, a novel by Hal Clement

Film and television
 Starlight (TV series), a 1930s BBC program
 Starlight, a 1996 film starring Rae Dawn Chong and Willie Nelson
 Starlight, an upcoming film directed by Joe Cornish
 Starlight: A Musical Movie, a 1988 film featuring Tichina Arnold
 Starlight Glimmer, a character in the series My Little Pony: Friendship Is Magic
 Revue Starlight, a Japanese media franchise

Music
 Starlight (band), an alias used by Italian band Black Box for their hit single "Numero Uno"
 The Starlight, a bar and concert venue in Fort Collins, Colorado, US

Albums
 Starlight (Joan Armatrading album), 2012
 Starlight (Bethel Music album), 2017
 Starlight (Jon Stevens album), 2017
 Starlight (Wagakki Band EP), 2021
 Starlight, an EP by Regie Hamm

Songs
 "Starlight" (Babymetal song), 2018
 "Starlight" (Matt Cardle song), 2011
 "Starlight" (Dave song), 2022
 "Starlight" (Sophie Ellis-Bextor song), 2011
 "Starlight" (Muse song), 2006
 "Starlight" (The Supermen Lovers song), 2001
 "Starlight" (Taeyeon song), 2016
 "Starlight", a song by Accept from their 1981 album Breaker
 "Starlight", a song by Bethel Music and Amanda Cook from Starlight, 2017
 "Starlight", a song by Brave Combo from their 2004 release Let's Kiss: 25th Anniversary Album
 "Starlight", a song by Coco & Puttnam, vocals by Cathy Battistessa
 "Starlight", a song by Electric Light Orchestra from their 1977 album Out of the Blue
 "Starlight", a song by Freedom Call from their 2005 album The Circle of Life
 "Starlight", a song by Freezepop from their 2001 EP Fashion Impression Function
 "Starlight", a song by Andy Gibb from his 1977 debut album, Flowing Rivers
 "Starlight", a song by Gotthard from their 2012 album Firebirth
 "Starlight", a song by Helloween from their 1985 album Helloween
 "Starlight", a song by Loona from their 2017 album Mix & Match
 "Starlight", a song by Lou Reed and John Cale from their 1990 album Songs for Drella
 "Starlight", a song by Mumm-Ra from their 2007 album These Things Move in Threes
 "Starlight", a song by Savatage from their 1995 album Dead Winter Dead
 "Starlight", a song by Slash featuring Myles Kennedy from the 2010 album Slash
 "Starlight", a song by Stephanie Mills from the 1979 album What Cha Gonna Do with My Lovin'
 "Starlight", a song by Taylor Swift on her 2012 album Red and its 2021 re-recorded version
 "Starlight", a song by Tonight Alive from their 2011 debut album What Are You So Scared Of?
 "Starlight", a song by Trúbrot
 "Starlight", a song by VIXX
 "Starlight", a song by Wonderland from their 2011 album Wonderland

Other uses
 Starlight (interstellar probe)
 STARlight, a physics computer program
 Starlight (clipper)
 Starlight, Indiana, U.S., an unincorporated community
 Starlight, Pennsylvania, U.S., an unincorporated community
 Coast Starlight, an Amtrak train
 Starlight Children's Foundation, a charitable organization
 Starlights (women's cricket), a women's cricket team from South Africa

See also

 
 
 Starlight Theatre (disambiguation)
 Starlite (disambiguation)
 Stardust (disambiguation)
 Light (disambiguation)
 Star (disambiguation)